Kanchana Sita is a 1961 play by renowned Malayalam playwright C. N. Sreekantan Nair. The author took  inspiration for this play from the Uttara Kanda of Valmiki's Ramayana. The play is the first of Sreekantan Nair's dramatic trilogy based on the Ramayana, the other two are Saketham and Lankalakshmi. 

The play is about the tragedy of power, and the sacrifices that adherence to dharma demands, including abandoning a chaste wife. Kanchana Sita won the Kendra Sahitya Academy Award for the year 1962.

In 1977, G. Aravindan adapted the play into a film with same title. The film went on to become a great critical success and is regarded one of the best Indian films ever made.

References

Works based on the Ramayana
Indian plays adapted into films
Indian plays
Plays based on myths and legends
1961 plays
Malayalam-language plays
Sahitya Akademi Award-winning works